The Capreol Hawks were a Tier II Junior "A" ice hockey team from Capreol, Ontario, Canada.  This defunct hockey team was a part of the Northern Ontario Junior Hockey League.

History
The team started in 1978 and folded in 1986.  Prior to 1978, the Hawks were members of the NOHA Jr. B League, where they won a league title in 1971.  The team was founded in 1970 by Marshall and Bob Edwards.  After winning the 1970 Midget Championship, the Edwards' thought that the Hawks would fare well in Junior "B".  In their first season in the league, the Hawks won the League title.  They folded in 1986, after Marshall Edwards left the team due to health problems.

Season-by-season results

Alumni
Shannon Hope

Defunct ice hockey teams in Canada
Sports teams in Greater Sudbury
Northern Ontario Junior Hockey League teams
1970 establishments in Ontario
1986 disestablishments in Ontario
Sports clubs disestablished in 1986
Ice hockey clubs established in 1970